Feshkur (also Romanized as Feshkūr and Fashkūr; also known as Fishkūr and Pashkur) is a village in Kuhestan Rural District, Kelardasht District, Chalus County, Mazandaran Province, Iran. At the 2006 census, its population was 90, in 22 families.

References 

Populated places in Chalus County